Juan Ocampo may refer to:
 Juan Antonio Ocampo (born 1989), Mexican footballer
 Juan Carlos Ocampo (born 1955), Uruguayan footballer
 Juan Ocampo (Honduran footballer)